Tom Lee (born 2 January 1991) is a former professional Australian rules footballer who played for the St Kilda Football Club in the Australian Football League (AFL). He was also listed with the Adelaide Football Club, however, he did not play a senior match.

Career

Adelaide (2008)
He returned to Claremont at the end of the 2009 season having not made his AFL debut.

Claremont (2009–2012)
In 2011 and 2012, Lee played in Claremont's WAFL premiership side. He was named the best player on the ground in Claremont's 2012 Foxtel Cup victory over Werribee.

St Kilda (2013–2016)
In Round 3, 2013, he played his first game for St Kilda against . At the conclusion of the 2016 season, he was delisted by St Kilda.

References

External links

Tom Lee's WAFL statistics

1991 births
Living people
Claremont Football Club players
Sturt Football Club players
Australian rules footballers from Western Australia
St Kilda Football Club players
Sandringham Football Club players